WALV may refer to:

 WALV-CD, a low-power television station (channel 17, virtual 46) licensed to serve Indianapolis, Indiana, United States
 WALV-FM, a radio station (95.3 FM) licensed to serve Ooltewah, Tennessee, United States
 WUIE, a radio station (105.1 FM) licensed to serve Lakeside, Tennessee, which held the call sign WALV-FM from 2006 to 2021
 Bunyu Airport, Indonesia (ICAO code WALV)